The Cornell Lunatic is the college humor magazine at Cornell University, founded on April 1, 1978, by Joey Green.

History 
During Green's two-year tenure as editor, the Lunatic was a 72-page glossy magazine of satire and parody published once a semester. The Lunatic staff was responsible for many pranks on campus, including a parody of the 1979 Cornell–Yale Homecoming Football Game program, sold by the Lunatic staff as the real thing at the football stadium, resulting in Green's arrest and near expulsion from the University. Today, the Lunatic continues to publish once a semester, and the magazine is distributed on campus for free.

Material from the Cornell Lunatic from 1978 to 1981 was reprinted in the 1982 trade paperback book, Hellbent on Insanity, a collection of the best college humor, published by Holt, Rinehart & Winston and edited by Green, fellow Lunatic alumnus Alan Corcoran, and Bruce Handy, former editor of the Stanford Chaparral.

The Lunatic's spring 1983 issue, celebrating the magazine's fifth anniversary, featured contributions by professional cartoonists Mort Walker, B.K. Taylor, Robert Leighton, Shary Flenniken, Bobby London, Ron Hauge, Lloyd Dangle, Mimi Pond, and Ed Subitzky.

Over the years, the Cornell Lunatic has featured interviews with comedians John Cleese, Jay Mohr, and Ron Funches, and endorsements by comedians Jon Stewart, Bill Maher, Norm Macdonald, Andy Dick, author Dave Barry, and filmmaker Kevin Smith.  

In the spring of 2005, the Lunatic staff distributed a full-scale parody of The Cornell Daily Sun on campus.

On March 29, 2008, more than fifty Lunatic alumni and guests gathered at the Cornell Club in Manhattan to celebrate the Lunatics 30th anniversary and the publication of the book Lunacy: The Best of the Cornell Lunatic.

In March 2016, the Lunatic hosted a night of comedy at Willard Straight Hall featuring comedian Eric Schwartz, aka Smooth-E.

Honorary members of the Cornell Lunatic Alumni Association include Firesign Theatre's Phil Proctor, American Bystander editor and publisher Michael Gerber, and The Simpsons producer Mike Reiss.

Throughout the 2020 coronavirus pandemic, the Lunatic continued to produce digital issues, returning to print in Fall 2021. They hosted comedian and actor Ronny Chieng for a virtual event in April 2021. Later that year, the club established a second formal mascot, "Honse," a horse with an unspecified illness. As of 2022, the club boasts nearly 30 members and is one of the strongest comedy groups on Cornell's campus.

Notable alumni 

Some notable alumni from the magazine include:   

 Glenn Adamson, editor of The Journal of Modern Craft, author, and museum curator 
 Jeff Bercovici, author and Los Angeles Times Business editor 
 Lawrence Carrel, financial author and contributor to the Wall Street Journal and Forbes
 Adam-Troy Castro, science fiction, fantasy, and horror novelist, and winner of the 2008 Philip K. Dick Award
 Alan Corcoran, humor book author 
 Adam C. Engst, technology writer and author 
 Jordan Fabian, White House correspondent at Bloomberg
 Noah Goldstein, author and UCLA management professor 
 Marie Gottschalk, author and University of Pennsylvania political science professor
 Joey Green, author and humorist
 Joyce Hendley, nutrition author 
 Amanda Ann Klein, author 
 Scott Lapatine, founder and editor-in-chief of Stereogum
 Jill Holtzman Leichter, editor of the All About Birds Regional Field Guides 
 Farhad Manjoo, New York Times opinion columnist 
 Sendhil Mullainathan, author and Harvard economics professor
 J.T. Myers, Virgin Music Group co-CEO 
 Adam Osterweil, children's book author 
 Robert Pottle, children's poet 
 Marco Recuay, Emmy Award-winning visual effects artist 
 Jeff Seeman, screenwriter 
 Naren Shankar, producer of The Expanse and CSI 
 Chris Spear, technology author 
 Colleen Wainwright, TedX speaker 
 Robyn Lipsky Weintraub, New York Times and New Yorker crossword puzzle author 
 Stefanie Weiss, Washington Post columnist and feature writer 
 Jeremy Wolff, travel writer and professional photographer

References

External links
Cornell Lunatic Website

1978 establishments in New York (state)
Biannual magazines published in the United States
College humor magazines
Cornell University publications
Magazines established in 1978
Magazines published in New York (state)
Satirical magazines published in the United States
Student magazines published in the United States